Oterfløyte (or oterlokkefløyte ) is a Norwegian flute used to mimic otter sound to serve as a lure.  It is made of the wing bones of large birds, with a sound hole in the center column formed of resin or wax.

References

Flutes
Norwegian musical instruments